Hoofbeats of the Snorting Swine is an album by Cinghiale, a reed duo composed of Mars Williams and Ken Vandermark, which was released in 1996 on Eighth Day Music. At the time of recording Vandermark was member of the post-Hal Russell NRG Ensemble under Williams' leadership.

Reception

The Penguin Guide to Jazz states "Typical Vandermark in that it feels as if the duo is running (or careering) down composed lines, even as they blow right away from them... A dialogue for two epic sensibilities."

Track listing
 "Triple Double" (Vandermark) – 10:35
 "Rat Bastard" (Williams) – 3:33
 "Uncle Ferenze" (Williams) – 7:04 
 "Front Line" (Vandermark) – 13:31
 "Trunk Manuscripts"  (Vandermark) – 9:15
 "Rat Bastard Also" (Williams) – 4:26
 "Give and Take" (Vandermark) – 6:39
 "Road Hog" (Williams) – 10:05

Personnel
Mars Williams – tenor saxophone, alto saxophone, soprano saxophone, B-flat clarinet
Ken Vandermark – tenor saxophone, B-flat clarinet, bass clarinet

References

1996 albums
Mars Williams albums
Ken Vandermark albums